Ernest Burton may refer to:

Ernest DeWitt Burton (1856–1925), American biblical scholar
Ernest Burton (American football), former college football head coach